Gagok is a genre of  Korean vocal music for mixed female and male voices.  

Accompaniments and interludes are played by a small ensemble of traditional Korean musical instruments. 

It is inscribed in UNESCO Intangible Cultural Heritage List from 2010 and enlisted as South Korean Intangible Cultural Property from 1969.

External links
 This site features an image of a kagok ensemble.
 http://www.asianinfo.org/asianinfo/korea/perform/distinguishing_features_of_korea.htm
 Coralie Rockwell: kagok a traditional Korean vocal form

Korean styles of music
Important Intangible Cultural Properties of South Korea

Intangible Cultural Heritage of Humanity